"U.G.L.Y." is a song by American recording duo Daphne & Celeste. It was released on June 5, 2000, as the second single from their studio album, We Didn't Say That!. The song was written and composed by Michele Chiavarini, Tracy Kilrow, Michael Marz and S. Burkes, while its producer was Chiavarini. "U.G.L.Y." is a teen pop and bubblegum pop song with a cheerleading style, making it similar in this respect to Toni Basil's song "Mickey". Lyrically, the song is about people who Daphne & Celeste think are ugly.

The song received mixed reviews from music critics, with some saying it was a good single, but many panning it and at least one reportedly saying it was "inappropriate and ridiculous". It is still the subject of criticism to this day due to its harsh lyrics. Although it received unfavorable reviews upon its release as a single, the song did very well in New Zealand, where it peaked at number seven (its highest position on any chart anywhere in the world). Elsewhere it wasn't quite so successful, but the single would later be immortalized in the American box office hit film Bring It On (released August 2000) and its accompanied soundtrack.

Background
After the release of their first single, "Ooh Stick You", the duo decided to release "U.G.L.Y." as the second single from their forthcoming album, We Didn't Say That! (2000). The song was written and composed by Michele Chiavarini, Tracy Kilrow, Michael Marz and S. Burkes, and was produced by Chiavarini. They took the chorus from a Fishbone song called "Ugly".

Critical reception
Dean Carlson from AllMusic reviewed the album, but did not at that point intend to review the track itself. However, he did go on to review "U.G.L.Y." individually, giving it two and a half out of five stars when so doing. Andy Capper from NME said: UGLY' continues the playground putdown vibes of Daphne & Celeste's first single, 'Ooh Stick You'. It's a cool little tune, bolstered by a complete lack of irony or sickly kitsch vibes. Daphne & Celeste are queens in the making."

Reaction and criticism
Andy Capper's review of the song from NME is positive, but acknowledges nonetheless that it is "a bit ruder" than their previous single.

Chart performance
The single was a big success in New Zealand, where it peaked at number seven on the New Zealand Singles Chart and was certified platinum. However, it did not do as well in any other country. The song debuted at number forty-seven on the Australian Singles Chart, but only managed to peak at number forty. The song entered the charts at number eighteen in the United Kingdom, where it only managed to go that far.

Music video
The music video was directed by Phil Griffin and filmed on April 16, 2000.

Track listings
UK CD1
 "U.G.L.Y." (radio edit)
 "U.G.L.Y." (Tomboy Mix)
 "U.G.L.Y." (T-Total "Make Over" Mix)
 "U.G.L.Y." (video)

UK CD2 and Canadian CD single
 "U.G.L.Y." (radio edit)
 "U.G.L.Y." (Uglier Mix)
 Exclusive Daphne & Celeste interview

UK cassette single
 "U.G.L.Y." (radio edit)
 "U.G.L.Y." (Uglier Mix)

Charts

See also
 "Let's Get Ugly" and "U.B.L.U.D.", tracks on Pop Will Eat Itself's 1987 album, Box Frenzy. The 2003 reissue of this album also has the similarly named "Ugly" as one of its bonus tracks.

References

2000 singles
Daphne and Celeste songs
2000 songs
Universal Records singles